is a railway station on the Kagoshima Main Line operated by JR Kyushu in Yahatanishi-ku, Kitakyushu, Japan.

Layout
The station has one side platform and two island platforms, serving a total of five tracks. The station has a "Midori no Madoguchi" staffed ticket office.

History
The station was opened by JR Kyushu on 21 November 2000 as an additional station on the existing Kagoshima Main Line track.

Passenger statistics
In fiscal 2016, the station was used by 2,292 passengers daily (boarding passengers only), and it ranked 82nd among the busiest stations of JR Kyushu.

See also
 List of railway stations in Japan

References

External links 

  

Stations of Kyushu Railway Company
Railway stations in Fukuoka Prefecture
Railway stations in Japan opened in 2000